Wilco Mario Louw (born 20 July 1994 in Ceres, South Africa) is a South African rugby union player for the Harlequins in Premiership Rugby. His regular position is tighthead prop.

Career

Youth

In 2012, Louw got his first provincial representation when he was called up by Boland to represent them at the 2012 Craven Week competition in Port Elizabeth. Shortly after the competition, Louw was also named in the 2012 South African Schools squad. He played in three matches for them – against France, Wales and England, helping South Africa to victories in all those matches.

He made twelve appearances for the  side during the 2013 Under-19 Provincial Championship, helping them win twelve matches in a row in the pool stages. He played off the bench in the final against the s, a match which the Blue Bulls won 35–23 to secure the championship.

In 2014, Louw was included in the South Africa Under-20 squad that participated in the 2014 IRB Junior World Championship held in New Zealand. He started their opening match against Scotland before playing off the bench in a 33–24 victory against hosts and four-time winners New Zealand. He once again started their final pool match, a 21–8 victory over Samoa as South Africa finished top of the group to set up a rematch with New Zealand in the semi-finals. Louw came on as a replacement in their semi-final to help South Africa secure their fourth consecutive victory over New Zealand at this level, winning 32–25. He made his fifth appearance of the tournament in the final, but could not prevent South Africa finishing on the losing side this time, with England winning the championship for the second consecutive year with a 21–20 victory over South Africa.

Louw returned to domestic action after the Junior World Championship, making five starts for the s during the 2014 Under-21 Provincial Championship and scoring a try against the  team as they reached the final of the competition and eventually winning the title by beating  in the final.

Western Province / Stormers

In October 2014, it was announced that Louw would return to the Western Cape by joining  ahead of the 2015 season.

Harlequins

On 13 February 2020 Louw's signing for the 2020–21 season was announced by English Premiership Rugby club Harlequins. He started in the Premiership final and scored a try against Exeter on 26 June 2021 as Harlequins won the game 40-38 in the highest scoring Premiership final ever.

International

Louw was called up to the Springboks for the 2017 Rugby Championship following Coenie Oosthuizen's broken arm. Louw made his debut for the Springboks off the bench in the final round of the tournament which was a 24–25 loss to New Zealand.

Honours
 Currie Cup runner up 2015, 2018
 Currie Cup winner 2017
 Premiership Rugby Cup runner up 2019–20
 Premiership Rugby winner 2020–21

References

External links
 

South African rugby union players
Living people
1994 births
People from Ceres, Western Cape
Rugby union props
Stormers players
Western Province (rugby union) players
RC Toulonnais players
South Africa Under-20 international rugby union players
South Africa international rugby union players
South African expatriate rugby union players
South African expatriate sportspeople in France
Expatriate rugby union players in France
Harlequin F.C. players
Rugby union players from the Western Cape